Bland Holt (born Joseph Thomas Holt, (24 March 1851 – 28 June 1942) was a comedian and theatrical producer, active in Australia.

Biography

Holt was the son of Joseph Frederick Holt (known as Clarance) and his first wife Marie, née Brown. Holt was born at Norwich, England, came to Australia with his father, an actor/manager, in 1857, and made his first appearance on the stage when he was six years old. He was educated at the Church of England grammar school, Brighton, Victoria, and at the Otago boys' high school, Dunedin, New Zealand.

Holt returned to England aged 14 years and became a professional actor. He had experience in England, the United States and New Zealand, before establishing himself in Australia in 1876. His first production was Paul Merritt's play New Babylon at the Royal Victoria Theatre, Sydney, with Myra Kemble as the leading lady. The play started a six week Sydney season on 24 April 1880 before moving to the Theatre Royal, Melbourne.

For the next 30 years Holt continued to produce the principal melodramas of the period. Most of the time of his companies was divided between the Lyceum theatre, Sydney, and the Theatre Royal, Melbourne. Nothing was too realistic to be attempted; in one play there was a hunting scene with horses dogs and a stag; in another several horses finished a race across the stage; in another a circus ring was realistically presented with the regular acts being done. Holt introduced the first motor car on stage.

Holt himself had been an excellent clown in pantomime, and he played comedy parts in melodrama with great ability. He was prudent and successful in management and retired in 1909, living at Sunninghill in Cotham Rd (building now stands but are offices) Kew, Victoria, a Melbourne suburb, for part of the year, and in summer spending his time at his seaside home at Sorrento, Victoria. There he would entertain every year a party of veteran members of the profession. Holt wrote the play The Breaking of the Drought which was made into a film  in 1920. Holt died at Kew on 28 June 1942 in his ninetieth year. He married in 1887 Florence, daughter of William Curling Anderson, who survived him. He had no children.

Holt practically grew up in a theatre and knew exactly what suited his public. He personally supervised every detail of his productions, and was hard working. If Holt considered that a play needed revision or needed updating, he would write fresh dialogue for it himself. Holt's management style resulted in a harmonious theatrical company.

Holt is buried in the Boroondara General Cemetery.

References

External links

1851 births
1942 deaths
Australian dramatists and playwrights
Australian male stage actors
English emigrants to Australia
Actors from Norwich
Writers from Norwich
Burials in Victoria (Australia)
People educated at Brighton Grammar School